The 2022 World Athletics Combined Events Tour was the 24th edition of the global series of combined track and field event meetings organised by the World Athletics. This was the first season to feature three-tier World Tour format, dividing the meetings into 3 competition sub groups: Gold, Silver and Bronze Level.

The winners were Lindon Victor from Grenada and Adrianna Sułek from Poland.

Rules
Athletes were ranked by their best three World Atletics ranking points scores achieved during the period of 1 October 2021 – 30 September 2022. Ranking points were allowed to be collected on both outdoor (decathlon/heptathlon) and indoor (heptathlon/pentathlon) events.
While at least two of the scores had to come from the Combined Events Tour meetings, one could have came from major competitions on the International Calendar. 

The total prize money was US$202,000, split evenly between male and female athletes. The male and female winners each received $30,000, while second and third placed athletes were entitled to $20,000 and $15,000 respectively. Smaller prizes were given to the rest of the top eight finishers.

Calendar
The calendar featured 6 Gold, 2 Silver, 6 Bronze Level and also one Challenger meeting. 

Gold Level

Results

References

External links
Home page
Calendar and results

2022
Combined Events